The 2022 NASCAR Xfinity Series Championship Race was the 33rd and final stock car race of the 2022 NASCAR Xfinity Series, the Championship 4 race, and the 25th iteration of the event. The race was held on Saturday, November 5, 2022, in Avondale, Arizona at Phoenix Raceway, a  permanent tri-oval shaped racetrack. The race took the scheduled 200 laps to complete. Ty Gibbs, driving for Joe Gibbs Racing, put on a dominating performance, leading 125 laps, and held off Noah Gragson in the final few laps for his eleventh career NASCAR Xfinity Series win, and his seventh of the season. To fill out the podium, Justin Allgaier, driving for JR Motorsports, would finish in 3rd, respectively.

In addition to winning the race, Gibbs would also claim the 2022 NASCAR Xfinity Series championship. This was Gibbs' first championship in the Xfinity Series, and the second championship in a row for Joe Gibbs Racing.

Background 
Phoenix Raceway is a 1-mile, low-banked tri-oval race track located in Avondale, Arizona, near Phoenix. The motorsport track opened in 1964 and currently hosts two NASCAR race weekends annually including the final championship race since 2020. Phoenix Raceway has also hosted the CART, IndyCar Series, USAC and the WeatherTech SportsCar Championship. The raceway is currently owned and operated by NASCAR.

Phoenix Raceway is home to two annual NASCAR race weekends, one of 13 facilities on the NASCAR schedule to host more than one race weekend a year. It first joined the NASCAR Cup Series schedule in 1988 as a late season event, and in 2005 the track was given a spring date. The now-NASCAR Camping World Truck Series was added in 1995 and the now-NASCAR Xfinity Series began running there in 1999.

NASCAR announced that its championship weekend events would be run at Phoenix for 2020, marking the first time since NASCAR inaugurated the weekend that Homestead-Miami Speedway would not be the host track. The track will also hold the championship for the 2021 NASCAR Cup season.

Championship drivers 

 Noah Gragson advanced by winning at Homestead-Miami.
 Ty Gibbs advanced by winning at Martinsville.
 Josh Berry advanced by winning at Las Vegas.
 Justin Allgaier advanced by virtue of points.

Entry list 

 (R) denotes rookie driver.
 (i) denotes driver who are ineligible for series driver points.

Practice 
The only 50-minute practice session was held on Friday, November 4, at 4:05 PM MST.

Qualifying 
Qualifying was held on Saturday, November 5, at 11:30 AM MST. Since Phoenix Raceway is a tri-oval track, the qualifying system used is a single-car, one-lap system with only one round. Whoever sets the fastest time in the round wins the pole.

Race results 
Stage 1 Laps: 45

Stage 2 Laps: 45

Stage 3 Laps: 110

Standings after the race 

Drivers' Championship standings

Note: Only the first 12 positions are included for the driver standings.

References 

2022 NASCAR Xfinity Series
NASCAR races at Phoenix Raceway
NASCAR Xfinity Series Championship Race
NASCAR Xfinity Series Championship Race